The 1956–57 British Home Championship was the final full championship before the Munich air disaster would kill or end the careers of five England Internationals one from Northern Ireland mid-way through the following tournament. A close-fought competition between England and Scotland, the tournament also featured some very good performances from Wales and Ireland. For tournaments of the day, this was considered a low-scoring affair, although the performances were consistently high.

England won the championship in a close final match, but after the first round all could have taken the trophy. Unusually it was England who were grateful for a point in Belfast after a dominant display from the Irish in a 1–1 draw  with the Scots and Welsh also playing out an opening indecisive game. In the second games, Wales were well beaten by England, but Scotland were forced to struggle to a 1–0 win over Ireland. In the final matches, any team could still have taken the trophy, but Wales and Ireland outplayed each other in their match and as a result drew 0–0, leaving the final game to be the decider between the English and the Scots. England triumphed eventually in a tough 2–1 win.

Table

Results

References

1951
1956–57 in Northern Ireland association football
1956–57 in English football
1956–57 in Scottish football
1956–57 in Welsh football
1956 in British sport
1957 in British sport